Luis Andrés Moreira Mora (born June 20, 1996) is a professional Ecuadorian footballer. He was born in Guayas and currently plays for Celaya F.C.

References

External links
 

1996 births
Living people
Ecuadorian footballers
Association football midfielders
Club Celaya footballers
Ascenso MX players
Ecuadorian expatriate footballers
Ecuadorian expatriate sportspeople in Mexico
Expatriate footballers in Mexico